This is a list of members of the Western Australian Legislative Council from 22 May 1956 to 21 May 1958. The chamber had 30 seats made up of ten provinces each electing three members, on a system of rotation whereby one-third of the members would retire at each biennial election.

Notes
 On 20 March 1956, Metropolitan Province Liberal MLC Harry Hearn had died. Liberal candidate Reg Mattiske won the resulting by-election on 9 June 1956.
 On 18 July 1956, North Province Labor MLC Don Barker died. Labor candidate and former Premier Frank Wise won the resulting by-election on 22 September 1956.

Sources
 
 
 

Members of Western Australian parliaments by term